Mary Wagaki (born 20 June 1954) is a Kenyan long-distance runner. She competed in the women's marathon at the 1984 Summer Olympics. Wagaki won a silver medal in the 1500 metres at the 1973 All-Africa Games.

References

1954 births
Living people
Athletes (track and field) at the 1984 Summer Olympics
Kenyan female long-distance runners
Kenyan female marathon runners
Olympic athletes of Kenya
African Games silver medalists for Kenya
African Games medalists in athletics (track and field)
Place of birth missing (living people)
Athletes (track and field) at the 1973 All-Africa Games
20th-century Kenyan women